Kyösti Kallio's first cabinet was the eighth Government of the Republic of Finland. The cabinet's time period was November 14, 1922 – January 18, 1924. It was  minority government.
 

Kallio, 1
1922 establishments in Finland
1924 disestablishments in Finland
Cabinets established in 1922
Cabinets disestablished in 1924